Bayt ʿIṭāb was a Palestinian Arab village located in the Jerusalem Subdistrict. The village is believed to have been inhabited since biblical times. An ancient tunnel which led to the village spring is associated with story of Samson. Both during and after its incorporation into Crusader fiefdoms in the 12th century, its population was Arab. Sheikhs from the Lahham family clan, who were associated with the Qays tribo-political faction, ruled the village during Ottoman era. In the 19th century, this clan controlled 24 villages in the vicinity. The homes were built of stone. The local farmers cultivated cereals, fruit trees and olive groves and some engaged in livestock breeding.

After a military assault on Bayt ʿIṭāb by Israeli forces in October 1948, the village was depopulated and demolished. In 1950, an Israeli moshav, Nes Harim, was established north of the built up portion of Bayt 'Itab, on an adjacent peak.

History

Bayt ʿIṭāb is identified with Enadab, a name that appears in Eusebius' Onomasticon, written in the fourth century CE.

Crusader era
In the mid-12th century, Bayt ʿIṭāb hosted an impressive maison forte, or hall house, in the ancient centre of the modern village, that is thought to have served as the residence of Johannes Gothman, a Frankish crusader knight. The building had two stories, both vaulted; the ground floor entrance was protected by a slit-machicolation and had stairs leading to the basement and upper floor.

Nonetheless, his wife was forced to sell his landholdings after he was taken prisoner by Islamic forces in 1161, in order to raise the money needed for his ransom. It was then acquired by and made a fief of the Church of the Holy Sepulchre, possibly organised by the Order of the Holy Sepulchre.

The Arabic name of the village appears in Latin transliteration as Bethaatap in a list recording the sale of the land holdings belonging to Gothman in 1161. Its affiliations with the Crusader era has led some to erroneously characterize the village as "Crusader", when in fact its habitation by Arabs predates, persisted through and extended beyond this period.

Ottoman era
Edward Robinson visited the village in 1838, and described its stone houses, several of which had two storeys, as solidly built. In the center of the village were the ruins of a castle or tower. Robinson estimates, the village population was six to seven hundred people. He notes that Beit 'Atab, as he transcribes it, was the chief town of the 'Arkub (Arqub) district and the Nazir (warden) of the district lived there. Robinson recounts that he was "a good-looking man" from the Lahaam clan, and that when they arrived in the village, he was sitting conversing with other sheikhs on a carpet under a fig tree. Rising to greet them, he invited them to stay for the night, but as they were in a hurry to see more of the country before the setting of the sun, and so declined his offer.

In the mid-19th century, the sheikh of Bayt 'Itab was named 'Utham al-Lahham (Sheikh 'Othman al-Lahaam). He had been exiled in 1846, but had managed to escape and return. A supporter of the Qays faction, Lahham was in conflict with the Yamani faction leaders, especially the sheikh of Abu Ghosh. In the 1850s the conflict between these two families over the control of the district of Bani Hasan dominated the area. As Meron Benvenisti writes, al-Lahham waged "a bloody war against Sheik Mustafa Abu Ghosh, whose capital and fortified seat was in the village of Suba." In 1855, Mohammad Atallah in Bayt Nattif, a cousin of 'Utham al-Lahham, contested his rule over the region. In order to win support from Abu Ghosh, Mohammad Atallah changed side over to the Yamani faction. This is said to have enraged 'Utham al-Lahham. He raised a fighting force and fell on Bayt Nattif on 3 January 1855. The village lost 21 dead. According to an eyewitness description by the horrified British consul, James Finn, their corpses were terribly mutilated.

In February 1855, the Abu Ghosh-family came to the aid of Atallah, conquered  Bayt ʿIṭāb, and imprisoned ʿUtham al-Laḥḥām in his own house. With the help of one of the younger members of the Abu Ghosh-family, James Finn was able to negotiate a cease-fire between the  Atallah and Lahham -factions in Bayt 'Itab. For three years, relative peace reigned in the area; however, the Ottoman Governor of Jerusalem, Thurayya Pasha, and his policy of consolidating Ottoman control over the local districts, step by step, led to the last rebellion of the sheikhs in 1858–59. By the fall of 1859, when 'Utham al-Lahham was ninety years old, both he and Mohammad Atallah were deported to Cyprus by Thurayya Pasha. The rest of the Laḥḥām family was resettled in Ramla.

When  French explorer Victor Guérin visited  the village in 1863, "he found that the Sheikh's house, with the adjoining houses, is built upon the site of an old fort, some vaults of which remain, and seemed to him older than the Crusades. The people say that there is a subterranean passage from the castle to the spring at the bottom of the hill. They also told him that the village of Eshua (4 miles to the north-west) was formerly called Ashtual, and that between the villages of Sur'ah and Eshua is a waly consecrated to the Sheikh Gherib, and known also as the Kabr Shamshun, Tomb of Samson."  

Socin found from an official Ottoman village list from about 1870  that  Bayt 'Itab had  a population of 241, with a total of  89 houses, though the population count included men, only.  Hartmann  found that  Bayt 'Itab   had 100  houses.

In the late 19th century, Bayt ʿIṭāb was described as a village built on stone, perched on a rocky knoll that rose 60 to 100 feet above the surrounding hilly ridge. Its population in 1875 was approximately 700, all Muslim. Olive trees were cultivated on terraces to the north of the village. A large cavern (18 feet wide and 6 feet high) ran beneath the houses.

In 1896 the population of  Bet 'atab was estimated to be about 543 persons.

British Mandatory period 
In the 1922 census of Palestine conducted by the British Mandate authorities,  Bayt 'Itab  had a population of 504 residents; all Muslims, increasing in the 1931 census to  606, still all Muslims, in a total of 187 houses. It was in the sub-district of Ramle, but due to the rearrangement of district boundaries it was later in the sub-district of Jerusalem.

The original layout of  Bayt ʿIṭāb  was circular, but newer construction to the southwest (towards Sufla), gave the village an arc-shape. Most houses were built of stone. Agriculture was the main source of income. The village owned extensive areas on the coastal plain that were planted with grain. During the British Mandate in Palestine, some of this land was expropriated to make a large, government-owned woodland.  

In the 1945 statistics, it had a population of 540 Muslims, with  5,447 dunums of land.  Of this, a total of 1,400 dunams were used for cereals, 665 dunums were irrigated or used for orchards, while 14 dunams were built-up (urban) Arab land. 116 dunums were planted with olive trees, and the villagers also engaged in livestock breeding.

1948 War and aftermath

The village was depopulated between 19 and 24 October 1948, after the Harel Brigade captured the village as part of Operation Ha-Har. This operation was complementary to Operation Yoav, a simultaneous offensive on the southern front. Most of the village population fled southwards, towards Bethlehem and Hebron. One IDF account says that when the Harel Brigade approached the village at night, they already found the village deserted, but proceeded to destroy its houses.

In 1950, the Israeli village of Nes Harim was established north of the village site on village land. In 1992, Palestinian historian Walid Khalidi found the site strewn with rubble and the remains of a Crusader fortress. He noted two cemeteries that lay east and west of the village, and the fact that some of the surrounding land was cultivated by Israeli farmers.

In 2002, the Israel Nature and Parks Authority established a 130-dunam national park in the area, known as Horvat 'Itab. Remains at the site include a Crusader fortress, vaults, remnants of a wall and towers, tunnels, a columbarium and an olive press.   
A conservation project was undertaken to stabilize the vaulted building utilizing traditional technology.

Geography
A Roman road ran along a narrow ridge to the south of the village which also passed by Solomon's Pools. A low cliff to the east of the village was known as 'Arâk el-Jemâl ("the cliff, cavern or buttress of the camels").

Southeast of the village on the main road was the chief village spring known as ʿAin Beit ʿAṭāb  or ʿAin Haud.   Below this spring to the northwest, was a pool known as Birket 'Atab with its own spring, `Ain el-Birkeh. Another spring nearby was known as 'Ain el Khanzierh ("the spring of the sow"). Connecting the village to the chief spring was a rock tunnel said to be "of great antiquity," the entrance of which was known only to those well acquainted with the site. This cavern or tunnel, known in Arabic as Mgharat Bīr el-Hasuta, ("Cave of the Well of Hasuta") is "evidently artificial," and was hewn into the rock.  Some 250 feet long, it runs in a south-south-west direction from the village emerging as a vertical shaft (6 ft x 5 ft x 10 ft deep) about 60 yards away from the spring that supplied the village with water. The average height of the tunnel is about 5 to 8 feet with a width of about 18 feet. There were two entrances to it from the village, one in the west, and the other at the center, the latter being closed at one author's time of writing in the 19th century.

Biblical identification
In 1879, Lieutenant C. R. Conder, of the Palestine Exploration Fund (PEF), thought that the place Bayt ʿIṭāb should be identified with the biblical site known as "Rock of Etam" (Judges 15:11), by way of a corruption of its name, and which, according to Conder, was not a town at all, but "a strong rock." John William McGarvey (1881) quotes Conder on the linguistic evidence: "The substitution of B for M is so common (as in Tibneh for Timnah) that the name Atab may very properly represent the Hebrew Etam (eagle's nest); and there are other indications as to the identity of the site."

Survey of Western Palestine (1883), notes that the name of the "curious cave" at Bayt ʿIṭāb in Arabic is Bir el-Has Utah. Unable to find a meaning for the word in Arabic, they find it corresponds to the Hebrew word Hasutah, "[...] which is translated 'a place of refuge.' Thus the name seems to indicate that this place has been used from a very early time as a lurking or hiding place, as we gather it to have been in the time of Samson." McGarvey also relays Conder's belief that the cavern within the rock formation was "the real hiding place" of Samson after his destruction of the Philistine's grains.

Henry B. Tristram (1897) writes of Bayt 'Itab that it crowned "a remarkable rocky knoll," which he states is, "probably, the Rock Etam." Noting that an ancient tunnel ran down from the village eastward through the rock to the chief spring, he speculates that this would have made a good hiding place for Samson when according to biblical tradition, he "went down and dwelt in the top of the rock Etam" (Book of Judges, xv. 8).

See also
Depopulated Palestinian locations in Israel
List of villages depopulated during the Arab-Israeli conflict

References

Bibliography

 

 

 (Unhman al-Latham description: p230)
(Bayt 'Itab: p.193 ff.)  
   
 

  
     

  ( pp. 326,  338-340)

 
 (p. 266: Beitatap(?), p.  279: Betatap)
 
Schölch, Alexander (1986): Palästina im Umbruch 1856-1882. Wiesbaden and Stuttgart: Franz Steiner Verlag.

External links
Welcome To Bayt 'Itab
Bayt 'Itab,  Zochrot
Survey of Western Palestine, Map 17:  IAA, Wikimedia commons 
Bayt 'Itab in Antiquity Archaeological Survey of Israel
Itab from the Khalil Sakakini Cultural Center
 Bayt 'Itab, Palestine Family
Visiting the village erased from all but a family's memory, National Catholic Reporter

1948 Arab–Israeli War
District of Jerusalem
Arab villages depopulated during the 1948 Arab–Israeli War
Throne villages
Order of the Holy Sepulchre